The Symphony No. 66 in B flat major (Hoboken I/66) is a symphony by Joseph Haydn. The time of composition is uncertain, with one speculation from around 1775–1776. The symphony is scored for two oboes, two bassoons, two horns and strings.

Movements
Allegro con brio
Adagio
Menuetto & Trio
Finale: Scherzando e presto

L.P. Burstein has noted Haydn's use of the VII chord and the VII → V progression in the first movement.  A.P. Brown has noted how Haydn reworked material from the symphony's first movement into other compositions, including an overture in D and two other symphonies.

Notes

Symphony 066
1779 compositions
Compositions in B-flat major